The following table indicates party affiliation in the Commonwealth of Virginia for the individual offices of:
Governor
Lieutenant Governor
Attorney General

It also indicates the historical composition of the collective:
Senate
House of Delegates
State delegation to the United States Senate (individually)
State delegation to the United States House of Representatives

1776–1851

1852–present

References

See also
Politics in Virginia
Politics of Virginia

Politics of Virginia
Government of Virginia
Virginia